Day of Empire:  How Hyperpowers Rise to Global Dominance - and Why They Fall is a 2007 book by Yale Law School professor Amy Chua.

Summary 
The book discusses examples of "hyperpowers" throughout human history. The historicity and academic  rigor of this work has been questioned by graduates of the University of Wisconsin.

External links
 Doubleday (publisher) book web page

Reviews 
 Los Angeles Times review by Daniel Kurtz-Phelan, 11 November 2007
 New York Times review by Lance Morrow, 18 November 2007
 Salon review by Andrew O'Hehir, 19 November 2007

Other discussion 
 Interview with Chua by Harry Kreisler of the Institute of International Studies
After Words interview with Chua on Day of Empire, December 29, 2007

2007 non-fiction books
Achaemenid Empire
Books about civilizations
Books about geopolitics
Books about imperialism
Books about international relations
Books by Amy Chua
Doubleday (publisher) books
Hegemony
History books about ancient Rome
History books about the British Empire
History books about China
History books about the Dutch Empire
History books about Iran
History books about Japan
History books about Mongolia
History books about Nazi Germany
History books about Spain
Mongol Empire
Political science books
Tang dynasty